Al McCoy, (October 23, 1894 – August 22, 1966), born Alexander Rudolph, was a boxing World Middleweight Champion from 1914 to 1917. He had a total of 157 bouts. Of those determined officially, he won 44 with 27 by knockout, and had 6 losses, and 6 draws. Around 107 of his fights were no decision bouts.

Referees and judges in this era could not render a decision for fights in New York and most other states except in the case of a disqualification or knockout.  McCoy's BoxRec record on the right has newspaper coverage determining the winner for his large number of no decision bouts. Newspapers could also determine the outcome of a fight as a draw.

Early life and boxing career

McCoy was born Alexander Rudolph in Rosenhayn, Deerfield Township, New Jersey, on October 23, 1894. As a child, he moved with his family to Brownsville, Brooklyn, New York City, where his father found work as a kosher butcher. At age 14 he helped make ends meet by filling in as a boxer for preliminary fights at local boxing clubs, when the scheduled boxers failed to show.

Ken Blady speculates that his manager, Charley Goldman, had him change his surname to McCoy to hide his boxing from his religious parents who would have objected. Blady made the stunning observation that for his first nine years and 139 fights McCoy was undefeated.  This made his winning streak second only to English boxer Hal Bagwell, although the fact that a no-decision bout did not officially count as a loss, probably aided McCoy's record.

McCoy started boxing as a bantamweight, but fighting as a 138-pound lightweight in 1912, he began to attract attention. He defeated Young Erne, a competent Philadelphia lightweight, on November 9, 1912, in Philadelphia, winning in six rounds. The newspaper that gave him the edge noted that Erne was too out of condition to match well with the fit sixteen year old.

Fighting as a welterweight, on March 2, 1912, in a ten-round newspaper decision, he defeated the more accomplished boxer Terry McGraw who he outweighed. Fighting on July 3, 1916, in Queens, he defeated Dave Kurtz in a ten-round newspaper decision. Not surprisingly, the seventeen year old's luck took a turn when he fought Young Otto, a more accomplished Jewish lightweight boxer from New York's Lower East Side, nine years his senior, who would hold a record for most consecutive first-round knockouts. McCoy lost to the lighter Otto, though fighting at 155 in the light middleweight range.

In 1913, he battled even more impressive boxers, though winning far more rarely by knockout. In no decision bouts well into the middleweight range, he met Jewish boxer Soldier Bartfield, who would engage in close fights or defeat most of the great boxers of the era.  He also matched with Terry Mitchell, Billy Grup, KO Brennan, Bull Anderson and the Zulu Kid.  The newspapers had him winning all these standard ten round New York fights, except for a draw with the accomplished welterweight Zulu Kid.  He even defeated the exceptional Soldier Bartfield on August 11, 1913, knocking him to the canvas three times in the fight. McCoy would never again decisively beat Bartfield, though he would meet him at least four more times in his career. Though never winning a world title, Bartfield would meet and often defeat more champions and top contenders than nearly any other boxer of his era.

McCoy fought Wildcat Ferns to two draws by decision in Ohio where referees could determine the outcome of a bout without a foul or knockout occurring.

Winning the Middleweight World Championship

McCoy was originally scheduled to fight Joseph Chip in April 1914.  When Joe Chip fell ill, his brother,  Middleweight World Title holder George consented to the bout, probably considering it unlikely he would lose by knockout to nineteen year old McCoy.  For Chip to lose his title in New York, a knockout would be required. In his last 100 bouts, McCoy had only a 23% knockout rate, impressive, but probably not perceived as a serious threat to the Middleweight World Champion Chip.

Manager Charlie Goldman wisely advised McCoy to charge for a knockout from the first bell, assuming that Chip would box cautiously early in the first round against Al's unorthodox, left handed style. Taking his manager's advice, on April 7, 1914, McCoy landed a powerful left to Chip's jaw early in the first round, lifting him off the canvas, and achieving a victory that probably shocked the bookmakers. The knockout occurred just one minute and fifty seconds into the first around. The Pittsburgh Press noted that the Broadway Sporting Club in Brooklyn was only "fairly filled" as spectators may have stayed home expecting a loss or poor showing by their hometown boy. Robert Edgren, summarizing the last few seconds of the fight, wrote "McCoy's left fist started somewhere near his knees. He brought it up with all his strength. His body swung upward with the blow as though he had been swinging at a bag. His fist landed fairly on the point of the crouching champion's unguarded chin."

The Gazette Times noted that McCoy's winning punch was a counterpunch, and wrote, "Chip, eager to grasp his opportunity, started a right swing that had all the earmarks of a haymaker.  McCoy crossed in with his left, shooting over a hybrid punch which was half swing and half uppercut, and the New Castle fighter (Chip) went down flat, his head striking the floor of the ring." Aged 19, he became the youngest person as well as the first left handed-boxer ever to win a Middleweight World championship. It was also the shortest fight on record in which a boxer had taken a World Title from an opponent.

As the result of his youth, and unorthodox style, many boxing writers and fans considered McCoy's ascent to the world title a fluke. The Tacoma Times, were not alone in their sentiments when they wrote three a half full years after McCoy had taken the title, "Early in 1914, Chip (George) unfortunately ran into a punch in the first round of his bout with Al McCoy, and the latter assumed the title. McCoy was never a real champion and usually dodged anyone who was likely to knock him out."

The New York Evening World wrote ten months after he took the title from Chip, "McCoy has held the title technically, as no one has in turn knocked him out.  But as a champion our old friend Al is a mirth-producing object."

His successful defense of the title for 42 consecutive bouts would prove he deserved the honor of Middleweight World Champion. In fact, at 42 bouts, according to Ken Blady, McCoy had the longest undefeated streak of any boxer to ever hold a title.  While holding the championship, he allowed most of the world's top contenders to challenge him for it. He fought Soldier Bartfield twice on November 10, and 22, 1914 in Brooklyn losing by the decision of newspapers in ten round bouts.  Though not gaining a decided edge in the two well fought bouts, the exceptional Bartfield was unable to land a knockout, and so McCoy retained the title. He took on top contenders Willie Lewis, Willie KO Brennan, Jewish contender Emmit "Kid" Wagner, and Italian Joe Gans, losing only to Brennan by the decision of newspapers in their middleweight matchups. His bout with Lewis on October 13, 1914, at the Broadway Sporting Club in Brooklyn, resulted in a near knockout of Lewis, once a top welterweight contender, in the fourth round. New London's The Day noted, "the bell saved Lewis in the fourth round. He was tottering, incapable of defense, when the bell rang. He came up for the final round (fifth) groggy", and McCoy consequently knocked him out, using his left to deliver the telling blow in the prior round.

On January 25, 1915, he defeated the talented Joe Borrell by the decision of newspapers in a six-round bout in Philadelphia. Borrel had ended the career of ex-welterweight world champion Harry Lewis two years earlier when Lewis had resumed boxing too soon after being injured in a car accident. McCoy's March 23, 1915, bout with Silent Martin may have been a closer affair, as the Evening News wrote that McCoy "had the better of Silent Martin in seven of the ten rounds in Brooklyn," though several New York papers gave the close bout to Martin.

On April 6, 1915, again in Brooklyn, McCoy fought a thrilling rematch with George Chip in Brooklyn, and though losing the ten round no-decision bout in the opinion of the New York Times, Chip could not knockout McCoy, and so he retained the world title. The following month on May 4, 1915, again in Brooklyn, he fought contender Jimmy Clabby, in another title match where he successfully defended against a knockout. The New London Day noted that McCoy's primary aim was to prevent a knockout, and that he did not fight with a decided edge.  The paper wrote that with Clabby "McCoy entered the ring with the sole intention of employing every means to stay the limit, and he was successful."  The Day further noted that the boxing seemed listless, and that when Clabby "showed an inclination to exchange blows at short range, McCoy usually declined the issue," but that "Clabby was the agressor (sic) at all times."  Again fighting in Brooklyn, he faced top contenders Young Ahearn and Silent Martin, completing both title bouts without receiving a decisive knockout. In November 1915, he held off another challenge from Silent Martin.

Later career and losing the Middleweight World Title

In 1916, he took on Young Ahearn in another title bout, and rematched with George Chip in a non-title fight, forgoing knockouts in both bouts, but not gaining an advantage in the decisions of the New York Times. His strenuous schedule with top contenders had begun to wear on McCoy. Through 1916, he fared better achieving several knockouts against opponents who were of less caliber, before taking on a critical bout with 1926 World Middleweight Champion Harry Greb on April 30, 1917.  The Pittsburgh Post had Greb winning every round in a match where McCoy seemed clearly outmatched, but was unable to gain a knockout, even in the tenth round where he attempted in vain to land the telling blow.

McCoy finally lost his Middleweight Title on November 14, 1917, in his home city of Brooklyn against Mike O'Dowd, losing by a 6th-round knockout. The New London Day noted that McCoy was simply unable to fend off the blows of O'Dowd, writing "The men fought toe-to-toe from bell to bell, not because McCoy wished it thus, but because Mike kept boring in and swinging both hands to the head and body.  Al tried to clinch after every lead, but O'Dowd forced the champion to break away by the fury of his attack." The Day further noted that McCoy took punishment in the first three rounds but that by the fourth took much heavier blows to the jaw and midsection.  McCoy was down more than once in the fourth largely from blows to the face, but managed to knock O'Dowd down once with his signature left hook.  In the sixth round, McCoy was down twice from head and body blows before finally having his cornermen throw in the towel at a count of six on his third knockdown.

He rematched with future middleweight champion Greb on May 13, 1918, demonstrating his willingness to take on top talent even after his loss of the title, but was again outmatched by his stronger, more aggressive opponent. Though Greb had already defeated some exceptional challengers, McCoy had suffered through forty-six defenses while champion from the toughest of title contenders.

Later life
Retiring from East Coast boxing, McCoy moved to Los Angeles with his wife Ruth. Trying his hand at movies, he appeared in a role credited as "pug" in 20th Century Picture's 1933 The Bowery. Also appearing in the movie were New York Jewish boxers Phil Bloom, Joe Glick, and Abe Hollandersky, "Fireman" Jim Flynn, and heavyweight Frank Moran. The film involved a rivalry between bar owner Chuck Connors and central character Steve Brody.

It was set in the New York Bowery, in the Lower East side of Manhattan, around the 1890s, and contained a lot of non-professional fighting.  Actor George Walsh played real life character Steve Brodie, who indeed owned a Bowery bar and won fame jumping off the Brooklyn Bridge.  The other primary character Chuck Connors, played by Wallace Beery, managed a professional boxer. In a brief bit, Walsh is revealed to be Irish heavyweight boxing champion John L. Sullivan.

On October 9, 1937 McCoy appeared in the "Night of Memories" benefit for Wad Wadhams, at Hollywood Legion Stadium.  Wadhams was the victim of a stroke and had mounting medical bills.  In his career, he had worked as a boxing promoter matching boxers for legendary boxing promoter "Colonel" Jack Doyle who had completed contracts for Jack Dempsey.  Other featured boxers included Henry Armstrong, Jack Silver, Jimmy McLarnin, and Jackie Fields.

Death
When McCoy lost his home and most of his possessions in a fire in 1964, his health took a turn for the worse. Living on only a small state pension, chronic illness restricted him to living in a nursing home. He died on August 22, 1966, in Los Angeles, California.

Legacy and titles held
McCoy's professional record according to one source: 157 bouts — won 99 (26 KOs), lost 40, no-decisions 18. Note that newspaper decisions vary.

McCoy, who was Jewish, was inducted into the International Jewish Sports Hall of Fame in 1989.

Professional boxing record
All information in this section is derived from BoxRec, unless otherwise stated.

Official Record

All newspaper decisions are officially regarded as “no decision” bouts and are not counted to the win/loss/draw column.

Unofficial record

Record with the inclusion of newspaper decisions to the win/loss/draw column.

See also
List of middleweight boxing champions
List of select Jewish boxers

References

External links

 
McCoy's boxing record at Cyber Boxing Zone
McCoy at Jewish Sports

1894 births
1966 deaths
People from Deerfield Township, New Jersey
Sportspeople from Cumberland County, New Jersey
Jewish American boxers
Middleweight boxers
Jewish boxers
Boxers from New Jersey
World boxing champions
World middleweight boxing champions
American male boxers
20th-century American Jews